= Phadtare =

- Location: Indian states of Maharashtra, Karnataka, Madhya Pradesh, Gujarat and Goa
- Language: Marathi, Gujarati, Hindi, Kannada, Sanskrit
- Religion: Hinduism

Phadtare (or Fadtare) hail mainly from the Indian state of Maharashtra and states bordering it.

== History ==
The surname Phadtare originates from an important historical administrative title in Maharashtra, where the word "Phad" referred to the official department responsible for managing state revenues, financial transactions, and public accounts. The Phadtare was the supreme chief or head officer in charge of overseeing all the administrative personnel working within this crucial financial department. Originally, the family's true ancestral surname was Bhat, but because they held this powerful chief position, their surname later changed to Phadtare. Historically, this Phadtare (Bhat) family held this high-ranking authority and influence first, before the other branch of the Bhat family came into power after them.

The ancient Deshmukhi rights of the Khatav region (Pargana) have traditionally belonged to the Phadtare family. Multiple historical references to this exist since the pre-Shivaji era. A specific dispute resolution document (Mahzar) regarding the local leadership (Patilki) of Khatav, dated November 27, 1444, is fully available. Several subsequent dispute resolutions have also been published. This clearly demonstrates that the Phadtare Deshmukhs have held the Deshmukhi rights of the Khatav region since ancient times. In the Peshwa era, some Phadtares served as commanders in the Huzurat army Sardar raje Raoji Phadtare-Deshmukh from Siddheshwar Kuroli was one of the commandars in Huzarat then succeeded by Madhawrao Phadtare-Deshmukh. Letter was sent by Shri Nanasaheb Peshwa, the son of Shri Bajirao Peshwa, to the Deshmukh and Deshpande of Kuroli regarding a legal dispute over the Deshmukhi rights.They had disputes with Holkars of Indore for prestige in 1751 which was resolved by Chhatrapati and Peshwa.

== Family Tree Of Sardar raje Raoji Phadtare Deshmukh ==
- Sardar raje Raoji Phadtare Deshmukh
  - Sardar Madhavrao Phadtare Deshmukh (youngest son)
